Ylenia Scapin (born 8 January 1975 in Bolzano) is an Italian judoka.

She won two Olympic medals in different weight classes, in 1996 and 2000.

External links
 
 
 
 
 Ylenia Scapin at raisport.rai.it

1975 births
Living people
Italian female judoka
Judoka at the 1996 Summer Olympics
Judoka at the 2000 Summer Olympics
Judoka at the 2004 Summer Olympics
Judoka at the 2008 Summer Olympics
Olympic judoka of Italy
Olympic bronze medalists for Italy
Sportspeople from Bolzano
Olympic medalists in judo
Medalists at the 2000 Summer Olympics
Medalists at the 1996 Summer Olympics
Universiade medalists in judo
Mediterranean Games silver medalists for Italy
Mediterranean Games medalists in judo
Competitors at the 1997 Mediterranean Games
Universiade bronze medalists for Italy
20th-century Italian women
21st-century Italian women